David Hayes Kincheloe (April 9, 1877 – April 16, 1950) was a United States representative from Kentucky and a judge of the United States Customs Court.

Education and early life

Born on April 9, 1877, near Sacramento, Kentucky, Kincheloe attended the public schools and received a Bachelor of Science degree from Bowling Green Business College (now Western Kentucky University) in 1898. He read law, was admitted to the bar in 1899, and commenced practice in Calhoun, Kentucky. He served as prosecuting attorney of McLean County, Kentucky from 1902 to 1906. He moved to Madisonville, Kentucky in 1906 and continued the practice of law.

Congressional service

Kincheloe was elected as a Democrat to the United States House of Representatives of the  64th United States Congress and to the seven succeeding Congresses and served from March 4, 1915, until his resignation on October 5, 1930, having been appointed to the bench.

Federal Judicial Service

Kincheloe received a recess appointment from President Herbert Hoover on September 22, 1930, to a seat on the United States Customs Court vacated by Judge George Emery Weller. He was nominated to the same position by President Hoover on December 4, 1930. He was confirmed by the United States Senate on January 22, 1931, and received his commission on January 29, 1931. His service terminated on April 30, 1948, due to his retirement.

Death

Kincheloe died in Washington, D.C., on April 16, 1950. He was interred in Odd Fellows Cemetery in Madisonville.

References

Sources
 
 
 

1877 births
1950 deaths
Burials in Kentucky
Kentucky lawyers
People from McLean County, Kentucky
Judges of the United States Customs Court
United States Article I federal judges appointed by Herbert Hoover
20th-century American judges
Democratic Party members of the United States House of Representatives from Kentucky
United States federal judges admitted to the practice of law by reading law